This is a timeline of the history of the British broadcaster Grampian Television.  It provides the ITV network service for the north of Scotland.

Events after the renaming of Grampian Television as STV North in 2006 and the replacement of North Tonight with STV News at Six in 2009 are covered on the timeline of Scottish Television.

1960s 
1960 
 August – North of Scotland Television is awarded the licence to cover north and north east Scotland on the condition that positions on the board are offered to the two losing applicants, Caledonian Television and North Caledonian Television
 1961
 11 January – North of Scotland Television is renamed Grampian Television as it is thought that the North of Scotland TV name would be too cumbersome.
30 September – At 2:45pm, Grampian Television, the ITV franchise for North East Scotland, goes on air.
 1962
 In a bid to increase viewership, especially in the Dundee area, Grampian begins broadcasting light entertainment and music shows. Previously, Grampian's only local programming had been in news and current affairs.
 1963
 No events.
 1964
 Grampian is given a three-year extension to its licence. This is later extended by a further year.
 1965
 No events.
 1966
 No events.
 1967
 Prior to the 1968 contract round, smaller regional stations sought an affiliation with one of the four major ITV companies, who would provide the bulk of their programming. Grampian links up with ABC Weekend Television. Grampian goes on to retain its licence for a further seven years.
 1968
 August – A technicians strike forces ITV off the air for several weeks although management manage to launch a temporary ITV Emergency National Service with no regional variations.
 1969
 No events.

1970s 
 1970
 No events.
 1971
 30 September – Grampian Television marks its tenth birthday by commencing colour transmissions.
 1972
 16 October – Following a law change which removed all restrictions on broadcasting hours, Grampian is able to launch an afternoon service.
 1973
 No events.
 1974
 The 1974 franchise round sees no changes in ITV's contractors as the huge cost in switching to colour television would have made the companies unable to compete against rivals in a franchise battle.
 1975
 No events.
 1976
 No events.
 1977
 Grampian makes slight changes to its logo, most notably removing the animation.
 1978
 Grampian Television becomes the first British television station to adopt ENG video cameras for news coverage - a move which finally allows its regional news programme, Grampian Today, to extend from three to five nights a week. Grampian also develops its own outside broadcast unit, initially using studio equipment.
 1979
 10 August – The ten week ITV strike forces Grampian Television off the air. The strike ends on 24 October.

1980s 
 1980
 7 January – Grampian Today is relaunched as North Tonight as part of an effort to reflect northern Scotland as a whole. The new programme replaces Grampian Today which had been on air since around 1978.
 Grampian launches weekday and closedown news bulletins, called North News and North Headlines respectively.
 1981
 No events.
 1982
 Grampian updates its logo.
 1983
 1 February – ITV's breakfast television service TV-am launches. It is a UK-wide service and therefore contains no Scottish-specific content. Consequently, Grampian's broadcast day now begins at 9:25 am.
 Grampian opens a new studio in Inverness to increase newsgathering across the Highlands and Islands.
 1984
 Debut of Grampian Television’s current affairs programme Crossfire.
 1985
 3 January – The last day of transmission using the 405-lines system.
January – Grampian Television introduces a new computerised logo.
 1986
 No events.
 1987
 7 September – Following the transfer of ITV Schools to Channel 4, ITV provides a full morning programme schedule, with advertising, for the first time. The new service includes regular five-minute national and regional news bulletins.
 Ahead of the forthcoming launch of 24-hour broadcasting, Grampian ends its closedown news bulletin.
 1988
 Grampian launches weekend regional news bulletins and at the same time, all of Grampian's news bulletins are renamed as Grampian Headlines. 
 2 September – Grampian begins 24-hour broadcasting.
 1989
 1 September – ITV introduces its first official logo as part of an attempt to unify the network under one image whilst retaining regional identity. Grampian adopts the look and they make slight changes to its logo, most notably removing the animation.

1990s 
 1990
 No events.
 1991
 16 October – Grampian retains its licence. There were three applicants for the licence and the other two bid more than Grampian. However both failed the quality threshold test.
 1992
 No events.
 1993
 No events.
 1994
 May –  Grampian expands into radio and in conjunction with Border Television, Grampian is awarded the central Scotland licence. The station, Scot FM, launches on 16 September.
 1995
 No events.
 1996
 July – Grampian sells Scot FM to the Independent Radio Group for £5.25 million.
 1997
 June – SMG buys Grampian Television for £105 million. Shortly afterwards, the company became SMG.
 1998
 Summer – In-vision continuity is dropped with announcements made over a new black ident and slides. Grampian makes slight changes to its logo, most notably removing the animation. In September The continuity is moved to Glasgow.
 15 November – The public launch of digital terrestrial TV in the UK takes place.
 1999
 No events.

2000s 
 2000
28 February – Having decided not to adopt the 1999 ITV generic look, Scottish and Grampian launch a new on-screen logo.
 2001
 Grampian closes its Stornoway studio.
 2002
 Grampian Headlines is renamed Grampian News.
 2003
 6 January – Scottish and Grampian adopt the celebrity idents package, albeit with their own logos attached and with idents featuring a lot more Scottish personalities alongside those of ITV1.
June – Grampian moves to new smaller studios in the city's Tullos area of Aberdeen.
 2004
 8 January – Grampian's regional current affairs and politics series Crossfire is replaced by a new programme, Politics Now, which is broadcast on both Grampian and STV.
2005
No events
 2006
 30 May – After 45 years, the Grampian Television brand is consigned to history when the region is renamed STV North.
2007 
 8 January – Viewers of North Tonight begin to receive two different programmes - those in the Dundee, Angus, Perthshire and north-east Fife area receive a dedicated bulletin within the main North Tonight programme.
2008
No events.
2009
20 March –  The last main edition of North Tonight is aired ahead of a major revamp.
23 March – STV News at Six launches across Scotland as it also replaces Scotland Today. The bulletins remain fully localised although sub-regional inserts are now just five minute opt-outs.

See also 
 History of ITV
 History of ITV television idents
 Timeline of ITV
 Timeline of television in Scotland – includes coverage of Grampian's successor STV North
 Timeline of Scottish Television – includes coverage of Grampian's successor STV North

References

Television in the United Kingdom by year
ITV timelines